A bandstand (sometimes music kiosk) is a circular, semicircular or polygonal structure set in a park, garden, pier, or indoor space, designed to accommodate musical bands performing concerts. A simple construction, it both creates an ornamental focal point and also serves acoustic requirements while providing shelter for the changeable weather, if outdoors. In form bandstands resemble ornamental European garden gazebos modeled on outdoor open-sided pavilions found in Asian countries from early times.

Origins
During the 18th and 19th centuries this type of performance building was found in the fashionable pleasure gardens of London and Paris where musicians played for guests dining and dancing.
They were later built in public spaces in many countries as practical amenities for outdoor entertainment.

Many bandstands in the United Kingdom originated in the Victorian era as the British brass band movement gained popularity. Smaller bandstands are often not much more than gazebos. Much larger bandstands such as that at the Hollywood Bowl may be called bandshells and usually take a shape similar to a quarter sphere. Though many bandstands fell into disuse and disrepair in the post-World War II period, the cultural project the Bandstand Marathon has seen bandstands across the UK utilized for free live concerts since 2008.

History in Britain
The parks where most bandstands are found were created in response to the Industrial Revolution, when local authorities realized worsening conditions in urban areas meant there was an increasing need for green, open spaces where the general public could relax. The first bandstands in Britain were built in the Royal Horticultural Society Gardens, South Kensington in 1861. Bandstands quickly became hugely popular and were considered a necessity in parks by the end of the 19th century.
 
To assist the war effort during World War II, iron fittings were removed from many bandstands to be melted down and transformed into weapons and artillery. Many bandstands fell into disrepair and were boarded up in the late 1940s and 1950s. Other attractions – such as the cinema and television – were becoming increasing popular and traditional recreational parks lost much of their appeal.

Between 1979 and 2001, more than half of the 438 bandstands in historic parks across the country were demolished, vandalized or in a chronic state of disuse. In the late 1990s the National Lottery and Heritage Lottery Fund invested a substantial sum in the restoration and rebuilding of bandstands across the country. As a result of this funding, over eighty bandstands were either fully restored or replaced. Between 1996 and 2010 there was over £500 million worth of investments in parks - a significant chunk of this money was spent on the restoration and building of bandstands.

History in United States
Gazebo bandstands appeared in the United States after the Civil War (1861–65) to accommodate the brass and percussion "cornet" bands found in towns of every size. Styles ranged from exotic ″Moorish″ designs to ordinary wood pavilions with mill work trim. They were found in parks, court house squares and fairgrounds. Following the Worlds Columbian Exposition (world′s fair) of 1893 in Chicago, amusement parks based on the famous Midway became popular. These were often established by trolley companies to provide a trolley destination on weekends. Bandstands and dance pavilions were an essential feature of these parks. Most are no longer in existence.

After 1900, rectangular pavilions enclosing a stage and acoustical shell providing directional sound appeared in many parks. Styles of acoustical shells took several forms during the 20th century. In 1913 Frank Lloyd Wright designed a freestanding bandshell with edge–supported cantilever roof and no side posts for his Midway Gardens (demolished 1929) in Chicago. Variations on this design were built later in the century.

The 1928 Hollywood Bowl shell in California designed by Wright′s son Lloyd Wright was a prototype for the streamlined concrete bandshell of the 1930s. Many of these shells with their distinctive concentric arches survive as landmarks in parks across the US.

Preservation of historic bandstands is by local initiative. Some are on the National Register of Historic Places, usually as part of a historic district. Continuous use as performing venues is a good incentive to keep them maintained. When this is not possible they must be maintained solely as historic landmarks. In many places a succession of bandstands, sometimes as many as three or four, were built on the same site. Because of this practice it is important to preserve postcards and photographs of earlier structures as a historical record.

Notable bandstands

England 
In 1993, the Deal Memorial Bandstand was opened as memorial to the eleven bandsmen killed by 1989 Deal barracks bombing. The bandstand was erected by public subscription and is maintained by volunteers.

A good example of a semi-circular bandstand is the Eastbourne Bandstand, built in 1935 to replace a circular bandstand that stood on cast iron stilts.  Herne Bay, Kent contains a totally enclosed bandstand with a stage and cafe area, topped with copper-clad domes.

There is a very old bandstand at Horsham's Carfax, built in 1892 by Walter Macfarlane & C at the Saracen Foundry in Glasgow, and another one in its adjacent park. It was moved slightly from its original location, to better accommodate pedestrians and then refurbished in 1978 with funds raised by the Horsham Society and with council funding.  In 1992, the original design was rediscovered in museum archives and it was then restored to its original colour scheme.

Cornwall 
 Gyllyngdune Gardens in Falmouth (1907)
 Killacourt Gardens in Newquay
 Morrab Gardens in Penzance
 Truro Road Park in St Austell
 Victoria Gardens in Truro (1897)

Scotland 
Scotland's many ironwork foundries and manufacturers built bandstands that were subsequently erected at locations throughout the United Kingdom.

Some of the most notable bandstands in Scotland are located at:

 Alexander Hamilton Memorial Park in Stonehouse
 Bellfield Park in Inverness
 Bothwell Road Public Park in Hamilton
 Brechin Park in Brechin
 Bridgeton Cross, Glasgow 
 Burngreen Peace Park in Kilsyth
 Collison Park in Dalbeattie
 Clyde Retail Park in Clydebank
 Dock Park in Dumfries
 Duthie Park in Aberdeen
 George Allan Park in Strathaven
 Glebe Park, Falkirk in Falkirk
 Haugh Park in  Cupar
 Houston Square in Johnstone
 High Street, Falkirk in Falkirk
 Kelvingrove Park in Glasgow
 Langholm Town Bandstand
 Lewisvale Park in Musselburgh
 Macrosty Park in Crieff
 Magdalene Park in Dundee
 Overtoun Park in Rutherglen
 Princes Street Gardens in Edinburgh
 St Margaret's Drive Park in Dunfermline
 Stair Park in Stranraer
 The Links in Nairn
 The Scores in St Andrews, Fife

United States 
Abraham Lash bandstand in Bellville, Ohio (1879)
Alamo Plaza in San Antonio, Texas (1978)
Audubon Park, Isidore and Rebecca Newman Bandstand in New Orleans, Louisiana (1921)
Cambier Park in Naples, Florida (1987)
Central Park, Transfer House with rooftop bandstand in Decatur, Illinois (1895)
City Park (Square), Barnhouse Memorial Bandstand in Oskaloosa, Iowa (1912)
City Park in Platteville, Wisconsin (1992)
City Park, Popp′s Bandstand in New Orleans, Louisiana (1917)
Civic Square, Minnie M. Doane Gazebo in Carmel, Indiana (1987)
Cold Spring, NY at Water Front
Community Park in Jacksonville, Illinois (2:1879,1883)
Court House Square in Albion, Illinois
Forest Park, Nathan Frank Bandstand in St. Louis, Missouri (1925)
Fountain Square in Highland, Illinois (1980)
Garfield Park in Chicago, Illinois (1896)
Grant Park in Galena, Illinois (1900)
Hopedale Town Park Hopedale, Massachusetts (1903) scheme.
Horace White Park in Beloit, Wisconsin (1987) 
Iolani Palace, Royal Bandstand in Honolulu, Hawaii (1883)
Jones Park in Canton, Illinois (1991)
Kate Gould Park in Chatham, Massachusetts
Lane Place Gazebo in Crawfordsville, Indiana (1995)
Mill Creek Park, Fellows Riverside Gardens in Youngstown, Ohio (1983)
Millenium Park, Pritzker Pavilion in Chicago, Illinois (2003)
Milo, Iowa - History of Milo, IA bandstand http://www.cityofmilo.com/history/
Ocean Park in Oak Bluffs, Massachusetts (1880s) See accompanying photo
Old Town Plaza in Albuquerque, New Mexico (1936)
Olvera Street Plaza in Los Angeles, California
Onondaga Park in Syracuse, New York
Sam Houston Park in Houston, Texas (1905)
Square in Spillville, Iowa (1919)
Tappan Square, Clark Bandstand in Oberlin, Ohio (1987)
Tower Grove Park, Henry Shaw Bandstand in St. Louis, Missouri (1872)
Town Square in Ellington, New York (1824)
Townsend Common in Townsend, Massachusetts
US Naval Academy, Chapel Walk in Annapolis, Maryland
US Naval Academy, Parade Ground in Annapolis, Maryland
US Veterans Affairs Illiana Health Care System campus in Danville, Illinois (1901)
Village Green in Weston, Vermont
Village Park in Bishop Hill, Illinois (1976)
Wick′s Park in Saugatuck, Michigan (1976)
Washington Park in Michigan City, Indiana (1911)
Washington Park in Springfield, Illinois
West Side Park, Terry Bilbrey Bandstand in Champaign, Illinois (2008)
Williams Park in St. Petersburg, Florida (1953)

Worldwide

Canada: Central Park in Banff, Alberta (1986)
Canada: Dufferin Terrace, Chateau Frontenac in Quebec, Quebec
Canada: Public Gardens in Halifax, Nova Scotia (1887)
Denmark: Tivoli Gardens, Harmonie Pavilion in Copenhagen
Denmark: Tivoli Gardens, Promenade Pavilion in Copenhagen
Indonesia: Kraton (Sultan's Palace) in Yogyakarta
Mexico: Jardín Libertad in Colima City (1891)
Mexico: Plaza de Armas in Guadalajara (1907)
Monaco: Terrasse du Casino in Monte Carlo (1890)
Norway: Musikpavilonen by the National Theater in Oslo
Singapore: Bandstand in Singapore Botanic Gardens
Spain: Palco de la música, Cantón de Molíns in Ferrol (1894)
Spain: Plaça de la Palmera in Barcelona (1984)
Italy: Cassarmonica in Castellammare di Stabia (1911)
Italy: Cassarmonica in Naples
Italy: Cassarmonica in Catania
Italy: Cassarmonica in Augusta
Italy: Cassarmonica in Caltagirone
Serbia: Bandstand near Crnica river in Paraćin

In arts, entertainment, and literature
The function of the bandstand inspired the names of:

 the American television show American Bandstand (1952–1989) and
 the Australian television show Bandstand (Australia) (1958–72).
 the Broadway musical Bandstand

Movies and cinema:

In The Beatles animated film The Yellow Submarine (1968) John, Paul, George and Ringo find a Grand Bandstand with enough stored instruments to recreate Sgt. Pepper′s Lonely Hearts Club Band and musically liberate Pepperland from the Blue Meanies. Ringo frees the Pepperland musicians trapped on their bandstand inside a giant bubble.

Musical compositions:

"The Bandstand, Hyde Park (La Kiosque de Hyde Park)" movement 3 of "Frescoes (Fresques) Suite" by Haydn Wood. London: Boosey & Hawkes QMB Edition no. 78 (military band)
"The Silver Gazebo" (1996) march by James Barnes. San Antonio, Texas: Southern Music Company (Kelly Bandstand in South Park, Lawrence, Kansas)

Works of art and design:

Bandstand in Vauxhall Gardens, London, color engraving by Muller (1751)
A General Prospect of Vaux Hall Gardens, color engraving drawn by Samuel Wale and engraved by I.S. Muller (c.1751)
The Dancing Pavilion at Cremorne Gardens London, oil painting by Phoebus Levin (1864)
Le Dimanche, musique à la campagne, painting by Raoul Dufy (1942–43)
Chatham, Massachusetts band concert in Kate Gould Park, painting by Grace Chapin
″The Coronation Pavilion also known as the Royal Bandstand″ Honolulu, counted cross stitch design by Frances L. Johnson Designs, Honolulu, Hawaii
The Great Bandstand Design Competition: Exhibition, 2 May–5 July 1987, Allen Memorial Art Museum, Oberlin, Ohio (architectural drawings)

See also
Belvedere
Dance pavilion
Deal barracks bombing
Gazebo
Hyde Park and Regent's Park bombings
Kiosk
Pavilion
Shell (theater)

Citations

General and cited sources
 Martin, Linda and Kerry Segrove (1983). City Parks of Canada. Oakville, Ontario: Mosaic Press.
 Mussat, Marie–Claire (1992). La Belle Epoque des Kiosques à Musique. Paris: Du May. . (International)
 Starr, S. Frederick, ed. (1987). The Oberlin Book of Bandstands. Washington DC: Preservation Press. . (United States)

External links

Vintage Bandstand photographs

 
Buildings and structures by type
Music venues
Outdoor structures